Mount Oxford can refer to:

 Mount Oxford (Colorado) in Colorado, United States
 Mount Oxford (Nunavut) in Nunavut, Canada
 Mount Oxford in Canterbury, New Zealand